Wynot is a village in Cedar County, Nebraska, United States. The population was 217 at the 2020 census.

History
Wynot got its start following construction of the railroad through the territory. According to tradition, it was derived from an old German settler's common answer of "Why not?"

Geography
Wynot is located at  (42.740533, -97.169956).

Demographics

2010 census
As of the census of 2010, there were 166 people, 77 households, and 51 families living in the village. The racial makeup of the village was 99.4% White and 0.6% from two or more races.

There were 77 households, of which 23.4% had children under the age of 18 living with them, 55.8% were married couples living together, 5.2% had a female householder with no husband present, 5.2% had a male householder with no wife present, and 33.8% were non-families. 31.2% of all households were made up of individuals, and 13% had someone living alone who was 65 years of age or older. The average household size was 2.16 and the average family size was 2.71.

The median age in the village was 50 years. 21.7% of residents were under the age of 18; 1.7% were between the ages of 18 and 24; 19.2% were from 25 to 44; 30.6% were from 45 to 64; and 26.5% were 65 years of age or older. The gender makeup of the village was 48.2% male and 51.8% female.

2000 census
As of the census of 2000, there were 191 people, 83 households, and 52 families living in the village. The population density was 997.8 people per square mile (388.1/km). There were 90 housing units at an average density of 470.2 per square mile (182.9/km). The racial makeup of the village was 100.00% White.

There were 83 households, out of which 28.9% had children under the age of 18 living with them, 48.2% were married couples living together, 10.8% had a female householder with no husband present, and 37.3% were non-families. 32.5% of all households were made up of individuals, and 16.9% had someone living alone who was 65 years of age or older. The average household size was 2.30 and the average family size was 3.00.

In the village, the population was spread out, with 26.2% under the age of 18, 6.3% from 18 to 24, 27.2% from 25 to 44, 18.8% from 45 to 64, and 21.5% who were 65 years of age or older. The median age was 40 years. For every 100 females, there were 103.2 males. For every 100 females age 18 and over, there were 101.4 males.

As of 2000 the median income for a household in the village was $27,750, and the median income for a family was $38,750. Males had a median income of $21,389 versus $19,688 for females. The per capita income for the village was $14,937. None of the families and 3.4% of the population were living below the poverty line, including no under eighteens and 16.2% of those over 64.

See also
Whynot, North Carolina

References

External links
 Official website

Villages in Cedar County, Nebraska
Villages in Nebraska